The Rockville Bridge is the longest stone masonry arch railroad viaduct ever built, with forty-eight 70-foot spans and a total length of . The eastern end is in Rockville and the western end is just south of Marysville.

Completed in 1902 by the Pennsylvania Railroad, it remains in use today by the Norfolk Southern Railway and Amtrak's Pennsylvanian route.

The bridge was listed on the National Register of Historic Places in 1975 and was designated as a National Historic Civil Engineering Landmark in 1979.

History

The first bridge at the site was a one-track wooden truss. It opened on September 1, 1849, when the PRR began operating over it. The Northern Central Railway began to use it after abandoning their Marysville Bridge. 

It was replaced in 1877 with a double-track iron truss bridge.

The third and current bridge was built between April 1900 and March 1902 by Drake & Stratton Co., which built the eastern half, and H.S. Kerbaugh, working from the west. The laborers were Italian or local.

Control of the bridge passed to Penn Central after the PRR merger in 1968, then to Conrail and finally the Norfolk Southern. 

For most of its life, the bridge carried four main line tracks. They were reduced to three in the 1980s when the former PRR Main Line was modernized across Pennsylvania. In the late 1990s, an intermodal container was blown off an intermodal freight train and landed in the river, prompting Norfolk Southern to terminate the wye track to Enola at the west end of the bridge. This reduced the number of main line tracks to two, but left a buffer zone on either side to prevent further containers ending up in the river, although high winds from the departing December 2010 North American blizzard resulted in a similar outcome on December 27, 2010.

The track from the west side of the bridge was shortened back to a new CP point named "Mary" not because of wind blowing containers off, but because the curve in the switch at the former location caused lateral forces to blow out the side of the spandrel. This led to the failure of the downriver side under the weight of a coal train. When the spandrel failed, it also disproved the once popular thought that the core of the bridge was filled with concrete. During times of high wind it is routine to park heavy trains on the bridge as a wind shield. Currently, the bridge is used by the Norfolk Southern Railway and Amtrak.

See also
List of bridges documented by the Historic American Engineering Record in Pennsylvania
List of crossings of the Susquehanna River

References

Further reading

External links 

Pennsylvania's Historical Architecture and Archaeology site photos:  
Rockville Bridge (photos and information)

Rockville Bridge Photos (November 5, 2005)
Stan's Railpix : Conrail Photo Gallery ( Rockville Bridge photos from Nov -1994 )

Bridges in Harrisburg, Pennsylvania
Pennsylvania Railroad bridges
Norfolk Southern Railway bridges
Bridges completed in 1902
Bridges completed in 1849
Railroad bridges on the National Register of Historic Places in Pennsylvania
Bridges over the Susquehanna River
Historic Civil Engineering Landmarks
Viaducts in the United States
Historic American Engineering Record in Pennsylvania
1849 establishments in Pennsylvania
National Register of Historic Places in Dauphin County, Pennsylvania
National Register of Historic Places in Perry County, Pennsylvania
Stone arch bridges in the United States